Ramón Romero is the name of:

Ramón Romero (baseball), Dominican baseball player
Ramón Romero Roa, Paraguayan politician
Ramón Ceja Romero, Mexican politician
Ramon Romero Jr., American politician